This is a list of the mammal species recorded in Ghana. Of the mammal species in Ghana, five are endangered, eleven are vulnerable, and fourteen are near threatened.

The following tags are used to highlight each species' conservation status as assessed by the International Union for Conservation of Nature:

Some species were assessed using an earlier set of criteria. Species assessed using this system have the following instead of near threatened and least concern categories:

Order: Tubulidentata (aardvarks) 

The order Tubulidentata consists of a single species, the aardvark. Tubulidentata are characterised by their teeth which lack a pulp cavity and form thin tubes which are continuously worn down and replaced.

Family: Orycteropodidae
Genus: Orycteropus
 Aardvark, O. afer

Order: Hyracoidea (hyraxes) 

The hyraxes are any of four species of fairly small, thickset, herbivorous mammals in the order Hyracoidea. About the size of a domestic cat they are well-furred, with rounded bodies and a stumpy tail. They are native to Africa and the Middle East.

Family: Procaviidae (hyraxes)
Genus: Dendrohyrax
 Western tree hyrax, D. dorsalis 
Genus: Procavia
 Cape hyrax, P. capensis

Order: Proboscidea (elephants) 

The elephants comprise three living species and are the largest living land animals.
Family: Elephantidae (elephants)
Genus: Loxodonta
African forest elephant, L. cyclotis

Order: Sirenia (manatees and dugongs) 

Sirenia is an order of fully aquatic, herbivorous mammals that inhabit rivers, estuaries, coastal marine waters, swamps, and marine wetlands. All four species are endangered.

Family: Trichechidae
Genus: Trichechus
 African manatee, Trichechus senegalensis VU

Order: Primates 

The order Primates contains humans and their closest relatives: lemurs, lorisoids, tarsiers, monkeys, and apes.

Suborder: Strepsirrhini
Infraorder: Lemuriformes
Superfamily: Lorisoidea
Family: Lorisidae
Genus: Perodicticus
 Potto, Perodicticus potto LR/lc
Family: Galagidae
Genus: Galagoides
 Prince Demidoff's bushbaby, Galagoides demidovii LR/lc
Genus: Galago
 Senegal bushbaby, Galago senegalensis LR/lc
Suborder: Haplorhini
Infraorder: Simiiformes
Parvorder: Catarrhini
Superfamily: Cercopithecoidea
Family: Cercopithecidae (Old World monkeys)
Genus: Erythrocebus
 Patas monkey, Erythrocebus patas LR/lc
Genus: Chlorocebus
 Green monkey, Chlorocebus sabaeus LC
 Tantalus monkey, Chlorocebus tantalus LC
Genus: Cercopithecus
 Campbell's mona monkey, Cercopithecus campbelli LR/lc
 Diana monkey, Cercopithecus diana EN
 Mona monkey, Cercopithecus mona LR/lc
 Lesser spot-nosed monkey, Cercopithecus petaurista LR/lc
Genus: Papio
 Olive baboon, Papio anubis LR/lc
Genus: Cercocebus
 Sooty mangabey, Cercocebus atys LR/nt
Subfamily: Colobinae
Genus: Colobus
 Ursine colobus, Colobus vellerosus VU
Genus: Procolobus
 Red colobus, Procolobus badius EN
 Olive colobus, Procolobus verus LR/nt
Superfamily: Hominoidea
Family: Hominidae (great apes)
Subfamily: Homininae
Tribe: Panini
Genus: Pan
 Common chimpanzee, Pan troglodytes EN

Order: Rodentia (rodents) 

Rodents make up the largest order of mammals, with over 40% of mammalian species. They have two incisors in the upper and lower jaw which grow continually and must be kept short by gnawing.

Suborder: Hystricognathi
Family: Bathyergidae
Genus: Fukomys
 Ghana mole-rat, Fukomys zechi LC
Family: Hystricidae (Old World porcupines)
Genus: Atherurus
 African brush-tailed porcupine, Atherurus africanus LC
Genus: Hystrix
 Crested porcupine, Hystrix cristata LC
Family: Thryonomyidae (cane rats)
Genus: Thryonomys
 Greater cane rat, Thryonomys swinderianus LC
Suborder: Sciurognathi
Family: Anomaluridae
Subfamily: Anomalurinae
Genus: Anomalurus
 Beecroft's scaly-tailed squirrel, Anomalurus beecrofti LC
 Lord Derby's scaly-tailed squirrel, Anomalurus derbianus LC
 Pel's scaly-tailed squirrel, Anomalurus pelii NT
Subfamily: Zenkerellinae
Genus: Idiurus
 Long-eared flying mouse, Idiurus macrotis LC
Family: Sciuridae (squirrels)
Subfamily: Xerinae
Tribe: Xerini
Genus: Xerus
 Striped ground squirrel, Xerus erythropus LC
Tribe: Protoxerini
Genus: Epixerus
 Western palm squirrel, Epixerus ebii DD
Genus: Funisciurus
 Red-cheeked rope squirrel, Funisciurus leucogenys DD
 Fire-footed rope squirrel, Funisciurus pyrropus LC
 Kintampo rope squirrel, Funisciurus substriatus DD
Genus: Heliosciurus
 Gambian sun squirrel, Heliosciurus gambianus LC
 Small sun squirrel, Heliosciurus punctatus DD
 Red-legged sun squirrel, Heliosciurus rufobrachium LC
Genus: Paraxerus
 Green bush squirrel, Paraxerus poensis LC
Genus: Protoxerus
 Slender-tailed squirrel, Protoxerus aubinnii DD
 Forest giant squirrel, Protoxerus stangeri LC
Family: Gliridae (dormice)
Subfamily: Graphiurinae
Genus: Graphiurus
 Jentink's dormouse, Graphiurus crassicaudatus DD
 Kellen's dormouse, Graphiurus kelleni LC
 Lorrain dormouse, Graphiurus lorraineus LC
 Nagtglas's African dormouse, Graphiurus nagtglasii LC
Family: Nesomyidae
Subfamily: Dendromurinae
Genus: Steatomys
 Northwestern fat mouse, Steatomys caurinus LC
 Jackson's fat mouse, Steatomys jacksoni VU
Subfamily: Cricetomyinae
Genus: Cricetomys
 Emin's pouched rat, Cricetomys emini LC
 Gambian pouched rat, Cricetomys gambianus LC
Family: Muridae (mice, rats, voles, gerbils, hamsters, etc.)
Subfamily: Deomyinae
Genus: Acomys
 Johan's spiny mouse, Acomys johannis LC
Genus: Lophuromys
 Rusty-bellied brush-furred rat, Lophuromys sikapusi LC
Genus: Uranomys
 Rudd's mouse, Uranomys ruddi LC
Subfamily: Gerbillinae
Genus: Gerbilliscus
 Guinean gerbil, Gerbilliscus guineae LC
 Kemp's gerbil, Gerbilliscus kempi LC
Genus: Taterillus
 Gracile tateril, Taterillus gracilis LC
Subfamily: Murinae
Genus: Arvicanthis
 African grass rat, Arvicanthis niloticus LC
 Guinean grass rat, Arvicanthis rufinus LC
Genus: Dasymys
 West African shaggy rat, Dasymys rufulus LC
Genus: Dephomys
 Defua rat, Dephomys defua LC
Genus: Grammomys
 Eastern rainforest grammomys, Grammomys kuru LC
Genus: Hybomys
 Temminck's striped mouse, Hybomys trivirgatus LC
Genus: Hylomyscus
 Allen's wood mouse, Hylomyscus alleni LC
 Baer's wood mouse, Hylomyscus baeri EN
Genus: Lemniscomys
 Bellier's striped grass mouse, Lemniscomys bellieri LC
 Typical striped grass mouse, Lemniscomys striatus LC
 Heuglin's striped grass mouse, Lemniscomys zebra LC
Genus: Malacomys
 Cansdale's swamp rat, Malacomys cansdalei LC
 Edward's swamp rat, Malacomys edwardsi LC
Genus: Mastomys
 Guinea multimammate mouse, Mastomys erythroleucus LC
 Natal multimammate mouse, Mastomys natalensis LC
Genus: Mus
 Hausa mouse, Mus haussa LC
 Matthey's mouse, Mus mattheyi LC
 Peters's mouse, Mus setulosus LC
Genus: Mylomys
 African groove-toothed rat, Mylomys dybowskii LC
Genus: Oenomys
 Ghana rufous-nosed rat, Oenomys ornatus DD
Genus: Praomys
 Dalton's mouse, Praomys daltoni LC
 Deroo's mouse, Praomys derooi LC
 Forest soft-furred mouse, Praomys rostratus LC
 Tullberg's soft-furred mouse, Praomys tullbergi LC

Order: Lagomorpha (lagomorphs) 

The lagomorphs comprise two families, Leporidae (hares and rabbits), and Ochotonidae (pikas). Though they can resemble rodents, and were classified as a superfamily in that order until the early 20th century, they have since been considered a separate order. They differ from rodents in a number of physical characteristics, such as having four incisors in the upper jaw rather than two.

Family: Leporidae (rabbits, hares)
Genus: Lepus
 African savanna hare, Lepus microtis LC

Order: Erinaceomorpha (hedgehogs and gymnures) 

The order Erinaceomorpha contains a single family, Erinaceidae, which comprise the hedgehogs and gymnures. The hedgehogs are easily recognised by their spines while gymnures look more like large rats.

Family: Erinaceidae (hedgehogs)
Subfamily: Erinaceinae
Genus: Atelerix
 Four-toed hedgehog, Atelerix albiventris LR/lc

Order: Soricomorpha (shrews, moles, and solenodons) 

The "shrew-forms" are insectivorous mammals. The shrews and solenodons closely resemble mice while the moles are stout-bodied burrowers.

Family: Soricidae (shrews)
Subfamily: Crocidurinae
Genus: Crocidura
 Buettikofer's shrew, Crocidura buettikoferi LC
 Crosse's shrew, Crocidura crossei LC
 Fox's shrew, Crocidura foxi LC
 Bicolored musk shrew, Crocidura fuscomurina LC
 Large-headed shrew, Crocidura grandiceps NT
 Lamotte's shrew, Crocidura lamottei LC
 West African long-tailed shrew, Crocidura muricauda LC
 West African pygmy shrew, Crocidura obscurior LC
 African giant shrew, Crocidura olivieri LC
 Fraser's musk shrew, Crocidura poensis LC
 Therese's shrew, Crocidura theresae LC
 Savanna path shrew, Crocidura viaria LC
Genus: Sylvisorex
 Climbing shrew, Suncus megalura LC

Order: Chiroptera (bats) 

The bats' most distinguishing feature is that their forelimbs are developed as wings, making them the only mammals capable of flight. Bat species account for about 20% of all mammals.

Family: Pteropodidae (flying foxes, Old World fruit bats)
Genus: Lissonycteris
 Angolan rousette, Lissonycteris angolensis LC
Subfamily: Pteropodinae
Genus: Eidolon
 Straw-coloured fruit bat, Eidolon helvum LC
Genus: Epomophorus
 Gambian epauletted fruit bat, Epomophorus gambianus LC
Genus: Epomops
 Buettikofer's epauletted fruit bat, Epomops buettikoferi LC
 Franquet's epauletted fruit bat, Epomops franqueti LC
Genus: Hypsignathus
 Hammer-headed bat, Hypsignathus monstrosus LC
Genus: Micropteropus
 Peters's dwarf epauletted fruit bat, Micropteropus pusillus LC
Genus: Myonycteris
 Little collared fruit bat, Myonycteris torquata LC
Genus: Nanonycteris
 Veldkamp's dwarf epauletted fruit bat, Nanonycteris veldkampi LC
Genus: Rousettus
 Egyptian fruit bat, Rousettus aegyptiacus LC
Genus: Scotonycteris
 Pohle's fruit bat, Scotonycteris ophiodon EN
 Zenker's fruit bat, Scotonycteris zenkeri NT
Subfamily: Macroglossinae
Genus: Megaloglossus
 Woermann's bat, Megaloglossus woermanni LC
Family: Vespertilionidae
Subfamily: Kerivoulinae
Genus: Kerivoula
 Lesser woolly bat, Kerivoula lanosa LC
 Spurrell's woolly bat, Kerivoula phalaena NT
Subfamily: Myotinae
Genus: Myotis
 Rufous mouse-eared bat, Myotis bocagii LC
Subfamily: Vespertilioninae
Genus: Glauconycteris
 Beatrix's bat, Glauconycteris beatrix NT
 Abo bat, Glauconycteris poensis LC
 Pied bat, Glauconycteris superba VU
 Butterfly bat, Glauconycteris variegata LC
Genus: Hypsugo
 Mouselike pipistrelle, Hypsugo musciculus DD
Genus: Mimetillus
 Moloney's mimic bat, Mimetillus moloneyi LC
Genus: Nycticeinops
 Schlieffen's bat, Nycticeinops schlieffeni LC
Genus: Pipistrellus
 Dark-brown serotine, Pipistrellus brunneus NT
 Cape serotine, Pipistrellus capensis LC
 Tiny serotine, Pipistrellus guineensis LC
 Aellen's pipistrelle, Pipistrellus inexspectatus DD
 Tiny pipistrelle, Pipistrellus nanulus LC
 Banana pipistrelle, Pipistrellus nanus LC
 Rendall's serotine, Pipistrellus rendalli LC
 Rüppell's pipistrelle, Pipistrellus rueppellii LC
 Rusty pipistrelle, Pipistrellus rusticus LC
 Somali serotine, Pipistrellus somalicus LC
 White-winged serotine, Pipistrellus tenuipinnis LC
Genus: Scotoecus
 Light-winged lesser house bat, Scotoecus albofuscus DD
 Dark-winged lesser house bat, Scotoecus hirundo DD
Genus: Scotophilus
 African yellow bat, Scotophilus dinganii LC
 White-bellied yellow bat, Scotophilus leucogaster LC
 Schreber's yellow bat, Scotophilus nigrita NT
 Robbins's yellow bat, Scotophilus nucella VU
 Nut-colored yellow bat, Scotophilus nux LC
 Greenish yellow bat, Scotophilus viridis LC
Family: Molossidae
Genus: Tadarida
 Duke of Abruzzi's free-tailed bat, Tadarida aloysiisabaudiae NT
 Sierra Leone free-tailed bat, Tadarida brachypterus LC
 Chapin's free-tailed bat, Tadarida chapini DD
 Angolan free-tailed bat, Tadarida condylurus LC
 Mongalla free-tailed bat, Tadarida demonstrator NT
 Lappet-eared free-tailed bat, Tadarida major LC
 Midas free-tailed bat, Tadarida midas LC
 Dwarf free-tailed bat, Tadarida nanulus LC
 Nigerian free-tailed bat, Tadarida nigeriae LC
 Peterson's free-tailed bat, Tadarida petersoni VU
 Little free-tailed bat, Tadarida pumila LC
 Russet free-tailed bat, Tadarida russata NT
 Spurrell's free-tailed bat, Tadarida spurrelli LC
 Railer bat, Tadarida thersites LC
 Trevor's free-tailed bat, Tadarida trevori VU
Genus: Myopterus
 Bini free-tailed bat, Myopterus whitleyi LC
Genus: Otomops
 Large-eared free-tailed bat, Otomops martiensseni NT
Family: Emballonuridae
Genus: Coleura
 African sheath-tailed bat, Coleura afra LC
Genus: Saccolaimus
 Pel's pouched bat, Saccolaimus peli NT
Genus: Taphozous
 Mauritian tomb bat, Taphozous mauritianus LC
 Naked-rumped tomb bat, Taphozous nudiventris LC
 Egyptian tomb bat, Taphozous perforatus LC
Family: Nycteridae
Genus: Nycteris
 Bate's slit-faced bat, Nycteris arge LC
 Gambian slit-faced bat, Nycteris gambiensis LC
 Large slit-faced bat, Nycteris grandis LC
 Hairy slit-faced bat, Nycteris hispida LC
 Intermediate slit-faced bat, Nycteris intermedia NT
 Large-eared slit-faced bat, Nycteris macrotis LC
 Dwarf slit-faced bat, Nycteris nana LC
 Egyptian slit-faced bat, Nycteris thebaica LC
Family: Megadermatidae
Genus: Lavia
 Yellow-winged bat, Lavia frons LC
Family: Rhinolophidae
Subfamily: Rhinolophinae
Genus: Rhinolophus
 Halcyon horseshoe bat, Rhinolophus alcyone LC
 Dent's horseshoe bat, Rhinolophus denti DD
 Rüppell's horseshoe bat, Rhinolophus fumigatus LC
 Lander's horseshoe bat, Rhinolophus landeri LC
Subfamily: Hipposiderinae
Genus: Hipposideros
 Aba roundleaf bat, Hipposideros abae NT
 Benito roundleaf bat, Hipposideros beatus LC
 Sundevall's roundleaf bat, Hipposideros caffer LC
 Cyclops roundleaf bat, Hipposideros cyclops LC
 Sooty roundleaf bat, Hipposideros fuliginosus NT
 Giant roundleaf bat, Hipposideros gigas LC
 Jones's roundleaf bat, Hipposideros jonesi NT
 Noack's roundleaf bat, Hipposideros ruber LC
Family: Rhinopomatidae
Genus: Rhinopoma
 Greater mouse-tailed bat, Rhinopoma microphyllum LC

Order: Pholidota (pangolins) 

The order Pholidota comprises the eight species of pangolin. Pangolins are anteaters and have the powerful claws, elongated snout and long tongue seen in the other unrelated anteater species.

Family: Manidae
Genus: Manis
 Giant pangolin, Manis gigantea LR/lc
 Long-tailed pangolin, Manis tetradactyla LR/lc
 Tree pangolin, Manis tricuspis LR/lc

Order: Cetacea (whales) 

The order Cetacea includes whales, dolphins and porpoises. They are the mammals most fully adapted to aquatic life with a spindle-shaped nearly hairless body, protected by a thick layer of blubber, and forelimbs and tail modified to provide propulsion underwater.

Suborder: Mysticeti
Family: Balaenopteridae
Subfamily: Balaenopterinae
Genus: Balaenoptera
 Common minke whale, Balaenoptera acutorostrata VU
 Sei whale, Balaenoptera borealis EN
 Bryde's whale, Balaenoptera brydei EN
 Blue whale, Balaenoptera musculus EN
 Fin whale, Balaenoptera physalus EN
Subfamily: Megapterinae
Genus: Megaptera
 Humpback whale, Megaptera novaeangliae VU
Suborder: Odontoceti
Superfamily: Platanistoidea
Family: Phocoenidae
Genus: Phocoena
 Harbour porpoise, Phocoena phocoena VU
Family: Physeteridae
Genus: Physeter
 Sperm whale, Physeter macrocephalus VU
Family: Kogiidae
Genus: Kogia
 Pygmy sperm whale, Kogia breviceps DD
 Dwarf sperm whale, Kogia sima DD
Family: Ziphidae
Genus: Mesoplodon
 Blainville's beaked whale, Mesoplodon densirostris DD
 Gervais' beaked whale, Mesoplodon europaeus DD
Genus: Ziphius
 Cuvier's beaked whale, Ziphius cavirostris DD
Family: Delphinidae (marine dolphins)
Genus: Orcinus
 Killer whale, Orcinus orca DD
Genus: Feresa
 Pygmy killer whale, Feresa attenuata DD
Genus: Pseudorca
 False killer whale, Pseudorca crassidens DD
Genus: Delphinus
 Short-beaked common dolphin, Delphinus delphis LR/cd
 Long-beaked common dolphin, Delphinus capensis DD
Genus: Sousa
 Atlantic humpback dolphin, Sousa teuszii  DD
Genus: Lagenodelphis
 Fraser's dolphin, Lagenodelphis hosei DD
Genus: Stenella
 Pantropical spotted dolphin, Stenella attenuata LR/cd
 Clymene dolphin, Stenella clymene DD
 Striped dolphin, Stenella coeruleoalba DD
 Atlantic spotted dolphin, Stenella frontalis DD
 Spinner dolphin, Stenella longirostris LR/cd
Genus: Steno
 Rough-toothed dolphin, Steno bredanensis DD
Genus: Tursiops
 Common bottlenose dolphin, Tursiops truncatus LC
Genus: Globicephala
 Short-finned pilot whale, Globicephala macrorhynchus DD
Genus: Grampus
 Risso's dolphin, Grampus griseus DD
Genus: Peponocephala
 Melon-headed whale, Peponocephala electra DD

Order: Carnivora (carnivorans) 

There are over 260 species of carnivorans, the majority of which feed primarily on meat. They have a characteristic skull shape and dentition.
Suborder: Feliformia
Family: Felidae (cats)
Subfamily: Felinae
Genus: Caracal
African golden cat, C. aurata 
Caracal, C. caracal 
Genus: Leptailurus
Serval, L. serval 
Subfamily: Pantherinae
Genus: Panthera
 Lion, P. leo VU
Leopard, P. pardus 
Family: Viverridae (civets, mongooses, etc.)
Subfamily: Viverrinae
Genus: Civettictis
African civet, C. civetta 
Genus: Genetta
Common genet, G. genetta 
 Johnston's genet, Genetta johnstoni NT
Rusty-spotted genet, G. maculata 
 Pardine genet, Genetta pardina LC
 King genet, Genetta poensis DD
 Hausa genet, Genetta thierryi LC
Family: Nandiniidae
Genus: Nandinia
African palm civet, N. binotata 
Family: Herpestidae (mongooses)
Genus: Atilax
 Marsh mongoose, Atilax paludinosus
Genus: Crossarchus
 Common kusimanse, Crossarchus obscurus LC
Genus: Herpestes
Egyptian mongoose, H. ichneumon 
Common slender mongoose, H. sanguineus LC
Genus: Ichneumia
White-tailed mongoose, I. albacauda  
Genus: Mungos
 Gambian mongoose, M. gambianus LC
Family: Hyaenidae (hyaenas)
Genus: Crocuta
 Spotted hyena, C. crocuta LC
Genus: Hyaena
Striped hyena, H. hyaena 
Suborder: Caniformia
Family: Canidae (dogs, foxes)
Genus: Lupulella
 Side-striped jackal, L. adusta  
Genus: Lycaon
 African wild dog, L. pictus  extirpated
Family: Mustelidae (mustelids)
Genus: Ictonyx
 Striped polecat, Ictonyx striatus LC
Genus: Mellivora
Honey badger, M. capensis 
Genus: Lutra
Speckle-throated otter, H. maculicollis  possibly extirpated
Genus: Aonyx
 African clawless otter, Aonyx capensis LC

Order: Artiodactyla (even-toed ungulates) 

The even-toed ungulates are ungulates whose weight is borne about equally by the third and fourth toes, rather than mostly or entirely by the third as in perissodactyls. There are about 220 artiodactyl species, including many that are of great economic importance to humans.

Family: Suidae (pigs)
Subfamily: Phacochoerinae
Genus: Phacochoerus
 Common warthog, Phacochoerus africanus LR/lc
Subfamily: Suinae
Genus: Hylochoerus
 Giant forest hog, Hylochoerus meinertzhageni LR/lc
Genus: Potamochoerus
 Red river hog, Potamochoerus porcus LR/lc
Family: Hippopotamidae (hippopotamuses)
Genus: Hippopotamus
 Hippopotamus, Hippopotamus amphibius VU
Family: Tragulidae
Genus: Hyemoschus
 Water chevrotain, Hyemoschus aquaticus DD
Family: Bovidae (cattle, antelope, sheep, goats)
Subfamily: Alcelaphinae
Genus: Alcelaphus
 Hartebeest, Alcelaphus buselaphus LR/cd
Genus: Damaliscus
 Topi, Damaliscus lunatus LR/cd
Subfamily: Antilopinae
Genus: Eudorcas
 Red-fronted gazelle, Eudorcas rufifrons VU extirpated
Genus: Neotragus
 Royal antelope, Neotragus pygmaeus LR/nt
Genus: Ourebia
 Oribi, Ourebia ourebi LR/cd
Subfamily: Bovinae
Genus: Syncerus
 African buffalo, Syncerus caffer LR/cd
Genus: Tragelaphus
 Giant eland, Tragelaphus derbianus LR/nt extirpated
 Bongo, Tragelaphus eurycerus LR/nt
 Bushbuck, Tragelaphus scriptus LR/lc
 Sitatunga, Tragelaphus spekii LR/nt
Subfamily: Cephalophinae
Genus: Cephalophus
 Bay duiker, Cephalophus dorsalis LR/nt
 Maxwell's duiker, Philantomba maxwellii LR/nt
 Black duiker, Cephalophus niger LR/nt
 Ogilby's duiker, Cephalophus ogilbyi LR/nt
 Red-flanked duiker, Cephalophus rufilatus LR/cd
 Yellow-backed duiker, Cephalophus silvicultor LR/nt
Genus: Sylvicapra
 Common duiker, Sylvicapra grimmia LR/lc
Subfamily: Hippotraginae
Genus: Hippotragus
 Roan antelope, Hippotragus equinus LR/cd
Subfamily: Reduncinae
Genus: Kobus
 Waterbuck, Kobus ellipsiprymnus LR/cd
 Kob, Kobus kob LR/cd
Genus: Redunca
 Bohor reedbuck, Redunca redunca LR/cd

See also
List of chordate orders
Lists of mammals by region
List of prehistoric mammals
Mammal classification
List of mammals described in the 2000s

References

External links

Ghana
Ghana
Mammals